Doni may refer to:

Entertainment
 Doni (Bulgarian singer) (born 1967), Bulgarian pop singer and actor
 Doni (Russian singer) (born 1985, Дони), Russian-Uzbeki rapper
 Doni Tamblyn (born 1952), American writer
 Doni Tondo or Doni Madonna, a 1507 painting by Michelangelo
 Portrait of Maddalena Doni (Raphael), a painting by Raphael
 Giovanni Battista Doni (c. 1593–1647), Italian musicologist
 Doni (film), a 2013 Sri Lankan children's drama film

Sports
 Doni (footballer) (born 1979), Brazilian international footballer
 Cristiano Doni (born 1973), Italian footballer

Other
 Doni (letter), a Georgian letter
 Doni River, a river in India
 Alternative spelling of Dhoni, a Maldivian sailing boat